Bishop is an unincorporated community located in McDowell County, West Virginia, and Tazewell County, Virginia, United States. Bishop lies on the Virginia-West Virginia state line at the intersection of West Virginia Route 16 and West Virginia Route 161.

References

Unincorporated communities in McDowell County, West Virginia
Unincorporated communities in Tazewell County, Virginia
Unincorporated communities in West Virginia
Unincorporated communities in Virginia